Southern Evangelical Seminary is a Christian college in Matthews, North Carolina, United States.

History
The seminary was established in 1992 by Norman Geisler and Ross Rhoads. The college, Southern Evangelical Bible College (SEBC), was established in 2004. SES has also been a member organization of the Evangelical Council for Financial Accountability since 1999.

Faculty

Alex McFarland was Seminary President from 2006 - 2011.

SES (& SEBC) faculty includes Richard Land, J. T. Bridges, Barry Leventhal, Brian Huffling, Doug Potter, Floyd S. Elmore, Thomas Howe, Melton B. Winstead, Timothy Brown.

SES Adjunct faculty includes Christina Woodside, Thomas Baker, Daniel Janosik, David Geisler, Fazale R. Rana, Frank Turek, Hugh Ross, Richard G. Howe, Wayne Detzler, Bernard James Mauser, Michael L. Brown, J. Warner Wallace and Ken Baker.

Bringing Every Thought Captive Radio

Bringing Every Thought Captive Radio is a daily radio show recorded with Dr. Richard Land.

Blog

Why Do You Believe is the blog of the SES (& SEBC).

Free Courses

SES (& SEBC) is offering Free Courses.

References

External links

Transnational Association of Christian Colleges and Schools
Evangelicalism in North Carolina
Evangelical seminaries and theological colleges in the United States
Organizations that oppose LGBT rights
Universities and colleges in Mecklenburg County, North Carolina
Seminaries and theological colleges in North Carolina
1992 establishments in North Carolina